Innherreds Folkeblad og Verdalingen is a local online and print newspaper in published in Verdal, Norway. Owned 97.6 percent by Adresseavisen, the newspaper has a circulation of 4,413 in 2013. It has three weekly issues, on Tuesdays, Thursdays and Saturdays. Published in tabloid format, the newspaper was created in 1952 through a merger to Innherreds Folkeblad and Verdalingen.

See also
 List of newspapers in Norway

References

External links
 Official website

Newspapers published in Norway
Verdal
Mass media in Trøndelag
1952 establishments in Norway
Newspapers established in 1952
Norwegian-language newspapers
Polaris Media